Eetu Vähäsöyrinki (born 12 April 1990) is a Finnish Nordic combined skier. He was born in Jyväskylä. He competed at the FIS Nordic World Ski Championships 2013 in Val di Fiemme, and at the 2014 Winter Olympics in Sochi.

References

External links

1990 births
Living people
Sportspeople from Jyväskylä
Finnish male Nordic combined skiers
Olympic Nordic combined skiers of Finland
Nordic combined skiers at the 2014 Winter Olympics
Competitors at the 2015 Winter Universiade
21st-century Finnish people